August Howard (January 2, 1910 - December 4, 1988) was the founder of the American Polar Society in 1934 and publisher of The Polar Times. In 1948 Cape Howard was named for him.

Biography
He was born on January 2, 1910, as August Horowitz to a Russian immigrant who worked as a tailor. In 1934 he founded the American Polar Society. He was a public affairs officer of the National Council of the Boy Scouts of America from 1928 to 1970. He died on December 4, 1988, in Rego Park, New York.

References

1910 births
1988 deaths
American Polar Society
National Executive Board of the Boy Scouts of America members